Luis González (1884 – death date unknown) was a Cuban pitcher in the Negro leagues and Cuban League in the 1900s and 1910s.

A native of Havana, Cuba, González played in the Negro leagues for the Cuban Stars (West) in 1908, 1910 and 1912. He also played several seasons in the Cuban League between 1905 and 1912.

References

External links
Baseball statistics and player information from Baseball-Reference Black Baseball Stats and Seamheads

1884 births
Date of birth missing
Year of death missing
Place of death missing
Club Fé players
Cuban Stars (West) players
Habana players
Cuban expatriate baseball players in the United States